Brett Lane (born 30 July 1988) is an Australian former rugby league footballer who played one National Rugby League match for the Canterbury-Bankstown Bulldogs.

He also played with the Wests Tigers Toyota Cup team in 2008.

He played his single first grade match in round 15 of the 2012 NRL season against the St. George Illawarra Dragons.

Lane is the older brother of Shaun Lane.

References

External links
NRL profile

1988 births
Canterbury-Bankstown Bulldogs players
Rugby league wingers
Newtown Jets NSW Cup players
Balmain Ryde-Eastwood Tigers players
Rugby league centres
Living people
Australian rugby league players
Rugby league players from Sydney